Island No. 1 (formerly called Cross Island) is a partially submerged island in the Napa River, upstream of San Pablo Bay (an embayment of San Francisco Bay). It is in Napa and Solano County, California, and parts of it are managed as part of the Napa-Sonoma Marshes Wildlife Area. It, along with Island No. 2, Green Island and Tubbs Island, are labeled on a 1902 USGS map of the area.

References

Islands of Solano County, California
Islands of Napa County, California
Islands of Northern California
San Pablo Bay